The Queensland Under-20 rugby league team, also known as Queensland Under-20s or Queensland U20, represents Queensland in the sport of rugby league at an under-20 age level. Since 2012, the team has played an annual fixture against the New South Wales Under-20s team for the Darren Lockyer Shield. The team features players selected from the NRL, Intrust Super Cup, Canterbury Cup NSW, Hastings Deering Colts and Jersey Flegg Cup competitions. They are administered by the Queensland Rugby League.

History
Prior to the advent of the National Youth Competition, junior interstate matches were contested at under-17 and under-19 levels. In 2008, the age levels switched to an under-16 and under-18 format but no under-20 game was held until 2012. In March 2012, the first under-20 Origin match was announced by the National Rugby League. The NRL had been looking into running the match for more than 18 months. In 2007, then-Gold Coast Titans managing director Michael Searle suggested an under-20 Origin series as a curtain raiser to the three senior State of Origin games. Former Queensland representative and  Queensland Origin coach Kevin Walters was named as inaugural coach of the Queensland under-20 team.

From 2012 to 2014, the under-20 Origin fixture was held in April, on the Representative Weekend. In 2015, the game was moved to July as a curtain-raiser to State of Origin.

In April 2017, Queensland legend Justin Hodges was named as head coach of the side.

In 2018, they recorded their first win in the fixture, defeating New South Wales 30–12 at Suncorp Stadium. On 16 November 2018, assistant coach and former Queensland representative Scott Prince took over as co-head coach, alongside former Brisbane Broncos women's head coach Paul Dyer, after Hodges was elevated to assistant coach of the senior Queensland side.

Players

Players selected for the Queensland under-20 team are under contract with a National Rugby League (NRL) side and play in either the NRL, Intrust Super Cup, Canterbury Cup NSW, Hastings Deering Colts or Jersey Flegg Cup competitions. Since 2013, the QRL has selected a pre-season under-20 squad featuring players in contention for the mid-season fixture. The squad participates in a weekend camp at the Queensland Academy of Sport.

2020 squad
The 24-man training squad selected for the 2020 season:

Results

2012

2013
Played as a curtain raiser to the Samoa-Tonga Pacific Rugby League test match.

2014
Played as a curtain raiser to the Samoa-Fiji Pacific Rugby League test match.

2015
Played as a curtain raiser to Game III of the 2015 State of Origin series.

2016
Played as a curtain raiser to Game III of the 2016 State of Origin series.

2017
Played as a curtain raiser to Game I of the 2017 State of Origin series.

2018
Played as a curtain raiser to Game III of the 2018 State of Origin series.

2019
Played as a curtain raiser to Game III of the 2019 State of Origin series.

See also
Queensland state rugby league team
Queensland Residents rugby league team
Queensland under-18 rugby league team
Queensland under-16 rugby league team
Junior Kangaroos
Australian Schoolboys rugby league team

References

Res
Rugby League State of Origin
Rugby league representative teams in Queensland